Nowa Wieś  used to be a village in the administrative district of Gmina Kaźmierz, within Szamotuły County, Greater Poland Voivodeship, in west-central Poland. It is a part of Kaźmierz at now.

The village has a population of 1,100.

References

Villages in Szamotuły County